Xu Ming is the name of:

 Xu Ming (徐明, 1971–2015), billionaire entrepreneur, former owner of Dalian Shide F.C.
 Xu Ming (figure skater) (徐铭, born 1981), Chinese figure skater

See also
Ming Xu (disambiguation)